Rebecca Steele may refer to:
 Rebecca Steele (cricketer), New Zealand cricketer
 Rebecca Steele (producer), Canadian film and television producer
 Rebecca Walker Steele, American musician and educator